Athanase George Politis (24 March 1893 – 4 April 1968, New York) was a Greek diplomat and historian, ambassador to the U.S.S.R. (1941–47) and to the United States (1950–54), who also represented his country at United Nations regional conferences. He had also "spent more than thirty years in his country's legations and embassies in Egypt, England, Japan." He resigned "in disagreement with the Cyprus policy of the Greek Government."

Writings 
 L'Hellénisme et l'Égypte moderne, Félix Alcan, Paris (1929-1930), 2 volumes
 Les rapports de la Grèce et de l'Égypte pendant le règne de Mohamed Aly (1833-1849), Société royale de géographie d'Égypte, Rome (1935)

References 

1968 deaths
1893 births
Ambassadors of Greece to the United States
20th-century Greek historians
Greek expatriates in the Soviet Union